My Wife's Relatives is a 1939 American comedy film directed by Gus Meins and written by Jack Townley. The film stars James Gleason, Lucile Gleason, Russell Gleason, Harry Davenport, Lynne Roberts and Tommy Ryan. The film was released on May 20, 1939, by Republic Pictures.

The film is the second of the nine-film Higgins Family series.

Plot
Joe Higgins is going to offer an expensive ring to his wife Lil to celebrate their 25th wedding anniversary, but gets fired from his job at the candy factory on the same day. Then Joe losses the ring and his son Sidney offers a reward to who finds it, meanwhile Grandpa begins to worry about the Higgins' finances and decides to marry a wealthy widow.

Cast
James Gleason as Joe Higgins
Lucile Gleason as Lil Higgins
Russell Gleason as Sidney Higgins
Harry Davenport as Grandpa Ed Carson
Lynne Roberts as Jean Higgins 
Tommy Ryan as Tommy Higgins
Purnell Pratt as Mr. Ellis
Maude Eburne as Widow Ella Jones
Marjorie Gateson as Mrs. Ellis
Henry Arthur as Bill Ellis
Sally Payne as Lizzie
Edward Keane as Jarvis

References

External links 
 

1939 films
American comedy films
1939 comedy films
Republic Pictures films
Films directed by Gus Meins
American black-and-white films
Films with screenplays by Jack Townley
Films produced by Sol C. Siegel
1930s English-language films
1930s American films